King of Bollywood is a 2004 British-Indian, English and Hindi language, comedy film written, edited, directed and produced by Piyush Jha, starring Om Puri in the lead role. The film is a satire of the Hindi film industry (Bollywood).

Plot
British journalist Crystal Chaurasia decides to make a documentary about a faded Bollywood star of yesteryear, Karan Kumar. She follows KK as he tries to make his comeback with a new movie. Meanwhile, his son Rahul disapproves of his efforts, but he increasingly comes to like Crystal.

Cast
 Om Puri as Karan Kumar ("KK")
 Sophie Dahl as Crystal Chaurasia
 Diwakar Pundir as Rahul
 Kavita Kapoor as Mandira Kumar
 Manoj Pahwa as Ratnesh, Karan Kumar's secretary
 Murli Sharma as Sunny

Release
The film released worldwide on 24 September 2004.

Music
 "My Heart Goes Dhak Dhak All The Time" (Kay Kay)
 "King Of Bollywood" (Chetan Shashital)
 "Tu Hai Sehari Babu, Babu" (Shreya Ghoshal, Shaan)
 "Road Dancer, Road Dancer" (Kunal Ganjawala)
 "Pyaar Me Haar" (Vijay Prakash, Kunal Ganjawala)

References

External links
 
King of Bollywood at Bollywood Hungama
 Om Puri is the king of Bollywood! rediff.com

2004 films
2000s Hindi-language films
Indian satirical films
Films about Bollywood